The 1992 PBA First Conference Finals was the best-of-7 series basketball championship of the 1992 PBA First Conference, and the conclusion of the conference playoffs. Shell Rimula X Zoomers and San Miguel Beermen played for the 51st championship contested by the league.

Shell Rimula X Zoomers won their second PBA title in three years, defeating San Miguel Beermen in their finals series, four games to one.

Qualification

Series scoring summary

Games summary

Game 1

San Miguel led 48-47 at halftime and 73-71 going into the final period, the Turbo Chargers went up by six points, 91-85, and had the game almost won in regulation, the Beermen forces extension on a 6-0 spurt with Yves Dignadice being fouled with no time left, Dignadice converted his two charities, forcing overtime. In the extra period, Bobby Parks was the difference as he pumped in 15 of Shell's 21 overtime points.

Game 2

Shell forward Ricky Relosa was thrown out when he deliberately aimed his elbow at Samboy Lim's injured left shoulder, Relosa was banned for the whole series, two Beermen namely Biboy Ravanes and Yves Dignadice had a bout with a fan who had been heckling Ramon Fernandez. Ravanes and Dignadice were suspended for one game while Fernandez was fined but managed to escape suspension.

Game 3

The Beermen had a big run in the third quarter to pull away, got their biggest lead of 27 points at 108-81.

Game 4

With Shell ahead, 100-98, a miscue between Ato Agustin and their import Rick Calloway, resulted to Agustin throwing a wayward pass, Ronnie Magsanoc recovered ball possession for Shell and his two free throws off a foul by Ramon Fernandez gave them a four-point edge, the Beermen had another miscue on their next offensive as Rey Cuenco intercepted their inbound pass and Magsanoc sealing the win with another pair of free throws.

Game 5

A decisive 7-0 run early in the fourth quarter put Shell further ahead, 85-76, the Beermen bogged down with three successive turnovers as the Turbo Chargers launch another barrage that gave them a 94-82 lead going into the last four minutes.

Rosters

Broadcast notes

References

External links
PBA official website

1992 PBA season
1992
San Miguel Beermen games
Shell Turbo Chargers games
PBA First Conference Finals
PBA First Conference Finals